is the 28th studio album by Japanese singer-songwriter Miyuki Nakajima, released in November 2000. The album features commercially successful double A-Side single "Earthly Stars (Unsung Heroes)"/"Headlight, Taillight", which became the number-one hit in later years and sold more than a million copies in Japan alone.

Track listing
All songs written and composed by Miyuki Nakajima, arranged by Ichizo Seo (except "Powdery Snow" co-arranged by David Campbell).
"" – 5:11
"" – 5:17
"" – 4:35
"" – 6:15
"Merry-Go-Round" – 5:54
"" – 4:24
"" – 3:43
"" – 2:32
"" – 6:32
"Tell Me, Sister" – 5:23
"" – 4:57

Personnel

Band
 Miyuki Nakajima –  vocals
 Ichizo Seo – keyboards, strings arrangement & conduct
 Hideo Yamaki – tomtom, cymbals
 Russ Kunkel – drums
 Vinnie Colaiuta – drums
 Gregg Bissonette – drums
 Neil Stubenhaus – bass guitar
 Hideki Matsubara – bass guitar
 Leland Sklar – bass guitar
 Michael Thompson – electric and acoustic guitar
 Masayoshi Furukawa – electric guitar, 12-strings acoustic guitar
 Elton Nagata – keyboards, acoustic and electric piano
 Shingo Kobayashi – keyboards, acoustic piano
 Jon Gilutin – acoustic and electric piano, hammond B-3, keyboards
 Yasuharu Nakanishi – keyboards
 Keishi Urata- computer programming
 Seiichi Takubo – computer programming
 Yousuke Sugimoto – computer programming
 Brandon Fields – tenor sax

Backing vocalists
 Fumikazu Miyashita – backing and harmony vocals
 Yasuhiro Kido – backing vocals
 Katsumi Maeda – backing vocals
 Toshiro Kirigaya – backing vocals
 Etsuro Wakakonai – backing vocals
 Julia Waters – backing vocals
 Maxine Waters – backing vocals
 Carmen Twillie – backing vocals
 Monalisa Young – backing vocals
 Clydene Jackson Edwards – backing vocals
 Oren Waters – backing vocals
 Luther Waters – backing vocals
 Johnny Britt – backing vocals
 Joseph Powell – backing vocals
 Terry Young – backing vocals
 Rick Logan – backing vocals
 Randy Crenshaw – backing vocals
 John Batdorf – backing vocals

Additional personnel
 David Campbell – strings arrangement, conducting
 Suzie Katayama – conducting
 Masatsugu Shinozaki – violin, concertmaster
 Joel Derouin – violin, concertmaster
 Bruce Dukov – violin 
 Mario De Leon – violin
 Armen Garabedian – violin
 Berj Garabedian – violin
 Endre Grant – violin
 Peter Kent – violin
 Rachel Purkin – violin
 Michele Richards – violin
 John Wittenberg – violin
 Charlie Bisharat – violin
 Brian Leonard – violin
 Robert Peterson – violin
 Haim Shtrim – violin
 Kiyo Kido – violin
 Jun Yamamoto – violin
 Yumiko Hirose – violin
 Osamu Inou – violin
 Kei Shinozaki – violin
 Yu Sugino – violin
 Naoyuki Takahashi – violin
 Kathrine Cash – violin
 Tsunehiro Shigyo – violin
 Keiko Nakamura – violin
 Machia Saito – violin
 Crusher Kimura – violin
 Takashi Kato – violin
 Masayoshi Fujiyama – violin
 Hitoshi Imano – violin
 Yukikane Murata – violin
 Jun Takeuchi – violin
 Akihiko Suzuki – violin
 Takayuki Oshigane – violin
 Akiko Kato – violin
 Hiroki Muto – violin
 Masako Mabuchi – viola
 Yuji Yamada – viola
 Gentaro Sakaguchi – viola
 Denyse Buffum – viola
 Matthew Funes – viola
 Janet Lakatos – viola
 Karie Prescott – viola
 Joshin Toyama – viola
 Gentaro Sakaguchi – viola
 Kaori Naruse – viola
 Masaharu Karita – cello
 Tomoya Kikuchi – cello
 Hiroki Kashiwagi – cello
 Yoshihiko Maeda – cello
 Masahiro Tanaka – cello
 Susumu Miyake – cello
 Steve Richards – cello
 Daniel Smith – cello
 Rudolph Stein – cello
 Paula Hoochatter – cello
 Don Markese – tin whistle, recorder

Chart positions

Album

Single

References

Miyuki Nakajima albums
2000 albums